The Bhandarkhal massacre was a political massacre that occurred in Bhandarkhal garden of Hanuman Dhoka, Kathmandu on 31 October 1846.

It was led by Jung Bahadur Rana, a month after the infamous Kot massacre.

References 

1846 in Nepal
Jung Bahadur Rana
Massacres in Nepal
Rana regime